Vignan Educational Foundation (VEF) is a registered trust established in Bangalore, Karnataka, India, in the year 1991.

Institutions run by VEF are Bangalore Institute of Dental Sciences & Hospital, Vignan Institute of Nursing, Katuri Medical College, Katuri College of Nursing, and International Medical and Technological University.

External links
http://bids.edu
http://www.vefedu.com

Educational organisations based in India
Organizations established in 1991